Aleisanthieae is a tribe of flowering plants in the family Rubiaceae and contains 10 species in 3 genera. Its representatives are found in Borneo, Malaysia, and the Philippines.

Genera 
Currently accepted names

 Aleisanthia Ridl. (2 sp) - Malaysia
 Aleisanthiopsis Tange (2 sp) - Borneo
 Greeniopsis Merr. (6 sp) - Philippines

References 

Ixoroideae tribes